Jean Étienne Benoît Duprat (1752–1809) was a French general in Napoleon's army.

He came from Avignon, and was a colonel in the Papal troops before it was united with France in 1791.

His younger brother was Jean Duprat, and they were both implicated in the Massacres of La Glacière.

He was killed at the Battle of Wagram.  His name is inscribed in column 19 of the Arc de Triomphe.

1752 births
1809 deaths
Generals of the First French Empire
Military personnel from Avignon
Names inscribed under the Arc de Triomphe
French military personnel killed in the Napoleonic Wars
Papal States military personnel
Officiers of the Légion d'honneur